Geumgok station is a railroad station in South Korea.

 Geumgok station (Namyangju)
 Geumgok station (Busan Metro)